Walter Rogers (born 1883; date of death unknown) was an English footballer who played in the Football League for Stoke.

Career
Rogers was born in Stoke-upon-Trent and was an unused squad player at Burslem Port Vale, before joining Football League Second Division side Stoke in 1907. His only appearance for Stoke which came in a 2–0 defeat away at Glossop on 15 February 1908. He left the Victoria Ground at the end of the 1907–08 season, and later played for Southern League side Reading.

Career statistics
Source:

References

English footballers
Association football midfielders
Port Vale F.C. players
Stoke City F.C. players
Reading F.C. players
English Football League players
Southern Football League players
1883 births
Year of death missing